Gail Dines (born 29 July 1958) is professor emerita of sociology and women's studies at Wheelock College in Boston, Massachusetts.

A radical feminist, Dines specializes in the study of pornography. Described in 2010 as the world's leading anti-pornography campaigner, she is a founding member of Stop Porn Culture and founder of Culture Reframed, created to address pornography as a public-health crisis. Dines is co-author of Pornography: The Production and Consumption of Inequality (1997) and author of Pornland: How Porn Has Hijacked Our Sexuality (2010).

Dines writes that boys and men are exposed online to pornography that is increasingly cruel and violent toward women; she argues that pornography is "the perfect propaganda piece for patriarchy". The exposure of teenage girls to the images affects their sense of sexual identity, with the result, Dines writes, that women are "held captive" by images that lie about them, and that femininity is reduced to the "hypersexualized, young, thin, toned, hairless, and, in many cases, surgically enhanced woman with a come-hither look on her face".

Early life and education
Dines was born to an Orthodox Jewish family in Manchester, England, and attended King David School. When she was 18, after reading Robin Morgan's book Sisterhood is Powerful (1970), she abandoned Orthodox Judaism and became a radical feminist, later calling her relationship to feminism "a passionate love affair". She spoke in 2011 about the appeal of radical feminism: "After teaching women for 20-odd years, if I go in and I teach liberal feminism, I get looked [at] blank ... I go in and teach radical feminism, bang, the room explodes. ... I remember what happened to me the first time I read radical feminism. I remember thinking: 'I have been waiting for this my entire life, and I didn't even know I was waiting for it."

She obtained her BSc from Salford University, where she met her husband, David Levy, who was studying at the University of Manchester. 
She embraced Marxism but became disillusioned with the British left when the students' unions voted to support that Zionism is racism, following United Nations General Assembly Resolution 3379, which meant Jewish student groups were denied funding. The atmosphere in the UK led to increased antisemitism. Swastikas were painted on Jewish homes; in a pub with Jewish friends, Dines heard a nearby group say they could "smell gas".

As a result, in 1980 when she was 22, Dines and Levy moved to Israel. While there she co-founded a feminist group, Isha L'isha ("Woman to Woman"), which described itself in 2018 as "the oldest grassroots feminist organization in Israel", and engaged in research at the University of Haifa into violence against women. She started her PhD thesis while volunteering in a rape crisis centre, after encountering pornography during a meeting in Haifa arranged by Women Against Pornography. The following day, she told her thesis advisor she wanted to write her dissertation on pornography: "I literally couldn't believe the images. I couldn't believe that men created such images, and that other men wanted to watch them."

The couple had a son, who was born while Levy was in Lebanon with the Israel Defence Forces, although both he and Dines opposed the war in Lebanon. Dines joined the Israeli peace movement and has continued to be critical of the expansion of Israeli settlements and the treatment of Palestinians in Gaza. Finding it increasingly difficult to live with the hyper-masculinity of Israeli culture, the family moved to the United States in 1986, where Levy began studying at Harvard Business School. Dines obtained her PhD in 1990, again from Salford, for a thesis entitled Towards a Sociology of Cartoons: A Framework for Sociological Investigation with Special Reference to "Playboy" Sex Cartoons.

Career and research

Dines worked at Wheelock College in Boston from 1986 for around 30 years; she became professor of sociology and women's studies there and chair of its American studies department. Levy became professor of management at the University of Massachusetts Boston.

The author of two books, including Pornland: How Porn Has Hijacked our Sexuality (2010), Dines has also written for a variety of journals and newspapers, including The New York Times, Newsweek, Time, and The Guardian. She is a founding member of Stop Porn Culture, co-founder of the National Feminist Anti-Pornography Movement, and founder of Culture Reframed, which aims to have pornography recognized as a public health crisis.

Dines's view of pornography is that it distorts men's view of sexuality, and makes it more difficult for them to establish intimate relationships with women. The violence and cruelty found in modern pornography is unlike earlier forms of soft-core pornography with which the general public may be familiar, Dines writes, and it degrades the position of women in society. She also views the prevalence of hardcore pornography as a contributing factor in increasing "demand" for sex trafficking.

In February 2011, Dines was invited, with fellow anti-pornography activist Shelley Lubben, to debate Anna Span, a pornographic film director, at the Cambridge Union, when it proposed the motion: "This house believes that pornography does a good public service." Dines did not sway the house, which decided 231 in favour to 187 against, with 197 abstentions. Dines said her opponents won because the chamber consisted mostly of "18–22 year old males who are using pornography on a regular basis".

Dines expressed opposition to the academic journal Porn Studies when it was founded, arguing that the "editors come from a pro-porn background where they deny the tons and tons of research that has been done into the negative effects of porn," and that they're "cheerleaders" for the porn industry.

Reception
Dines' book Pornland: How Porn Has Hijacked our Sexuality (2010) received mixed reviews, with some critics citing what they saw as her use of inflammatory language. Her writing has been criticized by other academics, including Ronald Weitzer of George Washington University. In an essay, "Pornography: the need for solid evidence" (2011), Weitzer alleged that Dines' work (specifically Pornland) is poorly researched and in strong opposition to the existing body of research on pornography. In "A Feminist Response to Weitzer" in the same journal, Dines wrote that her book had used theories and methods of cultural studies developed by, among others, Stuart Hall and Antonio Gramsci. Also in 2011, after Dines wrote about the porn industry in The Guardian, Lynn Comella, women's studies professor at the University of Nevada, Las Vegas, accused her of failing "to address counterevidence".

In 2007, Dines wrote an article on the Duke lacrosse case in which she suggested "we should put some of the focus back on the men in this case". Writer Cathy Young criticised what she saw as Dines' double standard, stating "the same feminists who rightly tell us that a rape victim should not have to be an angel to deserve support apply such a different standard to men who may be falsely accused of rape".

Lawsuit
In 2016, Dines and two other Jewish professors filed discrimination complaints against Wheelock College with the US Equal Employment Opportunity Commission, in relation to claims that the college's diversity efforts were not inclusive enough of Jewish students. One of their objections was that there was no appropriate food in the dining hall for Jewish students on Jewish holidays. After writing a letter in 2014 in pursuit of Jewish students' interests, the professors said their lives were made miserable, and they became the focus of antisemitic attacks. The college said the complaints were "without merit".

Awards 
 Myers Center Award for the Study of Human Rights in North America

Books

  Pdf.

Chapters

 
 
 
  (With Karen Boyle.)

References

External links

Gail Dines' website

1958 births
Alumni of the University of Salford
American feminist writers
American people of English-Jewish descent
American social activists
American women academics
Anti-pornography feminists
Anti-prostitution feminists
British emigrants to the United States
British Jews
English feminists
Jewish feminists
Living people
Academics from Greater Manchester
Radical feminists
21st-century American women